The 1976–77 Danish 1. division season was the 20th season of ice hockey in Denmark. Ten teams participated in the league, and Herning IK won the championship. Hellerup IK was relegated.

First round

Final round
The top six teams qualified for the final round, and Herning IK finished first.

External links
Season on eliteprospects.com

Dan
1976 in Danish sport
1977 in Danish sport